Argoides is an ichnogenus of dinosaur footprint, originally named as an ichnospecies of Ornithichnites, left by what was possibly an ornithopod, although due to the age of the tracks (some of which predate the oldest known ornithopod fossils), they were probably instead made by theropods. A 2.8 cm long footprint from the lower Jurassic represents the holotype.  The size of the track maker is estimated at 56 cm (1.84 ft) long and 185 grams (0.408 lbs) in weight. It has been found in the Portland, Passaic and Turners Falls Formations of Massachusetts, Connecticut and New Jersey.

See also
 List of dinosaur ichnogenera

References

Dinosaur trace fossils
Norian life
Rhaetian life
Hettangian life
Late Triassic dinosaurs of North America
Early Jurassic dinosaurs of North America
Paleontology in Connecticut
Paleontology in Massachusetts
Paleontology in New Jersey
Fossil taxa described in 1845